Tharaphu is a  2022 Burmese drama television series directed by Htut Naung Htun starring Kyaw Hsu, Chue Lay, Soe Myat Thuzar and Than Thar Nyi. It is an adaptation of the novel "Tharaphu" by Khin Hnin Yu. It aired on MRTV-4, from April 20 to June 1, 2022, on Mondays to Fridays at 19:00 for 31 episodes.

Synopsis
Aye followed her husband from Pyay. Aye who will be subjected to various kinds of oppression by her mother-in-law. When her sister-in-law, Rosie, had an affair with her boyfriend and became pregnant. Aye's mother-in-law decided to pretend to be Aye's baby. At that time, Aye's husband was abroad. Rosie came to Rangoon after giving birth. Rosie's mother told this child is not Rosie's child, this is Aye's child. Aye cannot surpass her mother-in-law's and she had to take care of her daughter-in-law's child like her child.When her husband returned, she could not bear the accusation and returned to her parents. Finally, Rosie explained everything to her brother and her husband. Aye's selfish mother-in-law gave up.

Cast
Kyaw Hsu as Soe Aung
Kaung Sett Naing as Kyaw Zan
Chue Lay as Aye
Than Thar Nyi as Rosie
Nan Sandar Hla Htun as Win Mar
Zin Wine as U Ba Swe
Soe Myat Thuzar as Daw Sein Shwe Sint
Aung Paing as Mya Han
Moe Thura as Leo Maung Maung
Moe Thiri Htet as Ma Thet
Nay Yee Win Lai as Devi Htun Kyaw
Great Chan as Khwar Nyo
Khun Seng as Thet Htun
Ingyin Htoo as Khet Khet Wai

References

Burmese television series
MRTV (TV network) original programming